Dacryodes dungii is a tropical forest tree species in the family Burseraceae.  It has only been recorded from Vietnam, where it may be called xuyên mộc dung; no subspecies are listed in the Catalogue of Life.

References 

Dacryodes
Trees of Vietnam